Mühlberg may refer to:

Places 
Mühlberg, Brandenburg, a town in the Elbe-Elster district, Brandenburg
Mühlberg, Thuringia, a village in the Gotha district, Thuringia
Mühlberg (Neustadt an der Waldnaab), a quarter of the town Neustadt an der Waldnaab, Bavaria 
Frankfurt Mühlberg station, a S-Bahn station in Frankfurt am Main
several hills and mountains are named Mühlberg

Other uses  
the Battle of Mühlberg, which took in place near Mühlberg, Brandenburg in 1547 
Georg Mühlberg (1863–1925), German painter